The 1973 Virginia Tech Gobblers football team was an American football team that represented Virginia Tech as an independent during the 1973 NCAA Division I football season. In their third year under head coach Charlie Coffey, the Gobblers compiled an overall record of 2–9.

Schedule

Players
The following players were members of the 1973 football team according to the roster published in the 1974 edition of The Bugle, the Virginia Tech yearbook.

References

Virginia Tech
Virginia Tech Hokies football seasons
Virginia Tech Gobblers football